High Island Independent School District is a public school district based in unincorporated Galveston County, Texas, United States.

HIISD serves the communities of Caplen, High Island, and Gilchrist on the Bolivar Peninsula.

History

Circa 2003 some Bolivar Peninsula residents in the Galveston Independent School District (GISD) portion who were dissatisfied with the Crenshaw School, the then-two campus GISD K-8 school on the peninsula, sent their children to High Island schools. Crenshaw was rebuilt as a single campus in 2005.

The school district lost approximately 15% of its students in 2008 due homes and residences destroyed by Hurricane Ike.  In the fall of 2009 the district reported an enrollment of 186 students.

Academic achievement
In 2009, the school district was rated "academically acceptable" by the Texas Education Agency.

Schools
High Island High School (Grades 9-12)
High Island Middle School (Grades 6-8)
High Island Elementary School (Grades K-5)

Special programs

Athletics
High Island High School plays six-man football.

See also

List of school districts in Texas

External links
High Island ISD

References

School districts in Galveston County, Texas